James Washington may refer to:
 James Augustus Washington (1831–1911), Confederate colonel during the American Civil War
 James H. Washington (1850–1916), Texas politician
 James W. Washington Jr. (1908–2000), African-American painter and sculptor
 James A. Washington Jr. (1915–1998), judge of the Superior Court for the District of Columbia
 Jim Washington (born 1943), American basketball player
 James Melvin Washington (1948–1997), African-American historian, educator, and minister
 Jim Washington (Canadian football) (1951–2018), Canadian football player
 James Washington (safety) (born 1965), American football player for the UCLA Bruins and in the NFL
 Jim Beanz (James David Washington, born 1980), American music producer
 James Washington (wide receiver) (born 1996), American football player

See also
 James Washington Logue (1863–1925), American politician
 James Washington Lonoikauoalii McGuire (1862–1941), royal courtier of the Hawaiian Kingdom
 James Washington Watts (born 1960), American professor of religion